Concepción (Spanish for conception) refers to the Immaculate Conception of Mary, mother of Jesus, according to Roman Catholic Church doctrine. Concepción or Concepcion may also refer to:

Geography

Argentina
Concepción, Catamarca, a village
Concepción, Corrientes, a town
Concepción, Tucumán, a city
Concepción de Buena Esperanza, dead city in Chaco province
Concepción de la Sierra, Misiones Province, a village
Concepción del Bermejo, Chaco, a village
Concepción del Uruguay, Entre Ríos, a city
Concepción Department, Argentina, Corrientes

Bolivia
Concepción, Santa Cruz, a town
Concepción Lake, Chiqui, a laketos Province

Chile
Bay of Concepción
Concepción, Chile
Concepción Province, Chile
Greater Concepción
Roman Catholic Archdiocese of Concepción

Colombia
Concepción, Antioquia
Concepción, Santander

Costa Rica
Concepción District, Alajuelita

Guatemala
Concepción, Sololá
Concepción Chiquirichapa
Concepción Huista
Concepción Las Minas
Concepción Tutuapa

Honduras
Concepción, Intibucá
Concepción, Ocotepeque
Concepción de María, Choluteca

Mexico
Concepción Buenavista
Concepción de Buenos Aires
Concepción Pápalo

Nicaragua
Concepción (volcano)

Paraguay
Concepción, Paraguay
Concepción Department, Paraguay
Roman Catholic Diocese of Concepción en Paraguay

Peru
Concepción, Junín
Concepción District, Vilcas Huamán
Concepción District, Concepción
Concepción Province, Peru

Philippines
 Concepcion, Gandara, Samar
Concepcion, Iloilo
 Concepcion, Misamis Occidental
Concepcion, Romblon
Concepcion, Tarlac

Spain
 Concepción (Madrid), a ward in Madrid

United States
 Concepcion, Texas

Mission Concepcion, a Franciscan mission in Texas

People
Bernabe Concepcion (born 1988), Filipino boxer
Camila María Concepción (1991–2020), American transgender rights activist and television writer
César Concepción (1909–1974), Puerto Rican musician
Concepción Aleixandre (1862–1952), Spanish physician
Concepcion Anes (1929/1930–2004), Gibraltarian politician
Concepción Arenal (1820–1893), Spanish feminist writer
Concepción Argüello (1781–1857), fiancée of Nikolai Rezanov and later nun
Concepción Badillo (born 1986), Spanish swimmer
Concepción Bellorín (born 1980), Spanish judoka
Concepción Blasco Oliver (1858–1938), Spanish philanthropist
Concepción Bona (1824–1901), Dominican independence campaigner
Concepción Cabrera de Armida (1862–1937), Mexican Catholic mystic and writer
Concepción Cascajosa (born 1979), Spanish communication scholar
Concepción Castañeda Ortiz (born 1952), Mexican politician
Concepción Dueso Garcés (born 1967), Spanish goalball player
Concepción Espejel (born 1959), Spanish magistrate
Concepción Felix (1884–1967), Filipina feminist and human rights activist
Concepción González Molina (born 1953), Mexican politician
Concepción Hernández Díaz (born 1972), Spanish goalball player
Concepción Langa Nuño, Spanish historian
Concepción Leyes de Chaves (1891–1985), Paraguayan writer
Concepción Lombardo (1835–1931), wife of the Mexican president Miguel Miramon
Concepción Mariño (1790–1854), participant in the Venezuelan War of Independence
Concepción Mendizábal Mendoza (1893–1985), Mexican civil engineer
Concepción Montaner (born 1981), Spanish long jumper
Concepción Ojeda Hernández (born 1977), Mexican politician
Concepción Palacios Herrera (1893–1981), Nicaraguan physician
Concepción Paredes (1970–2019), Spanish triple jump athlete
Concepción Picciotto (1936–2016), peace activist and nuclear-disarmament advocate
Concepción Quiñones de Longo, Puerto Rican pediatrician and government official
Concepción Ramírez (1942–2021), Guatemalan peace activist
Concepcion Rodriguez (born 1986), Panamanian baseball player
Concepción Robles Altamirano (born 1965), Mexican politician
Concepción Saiz Otero (1851–1934), Spanish educator and feminist
Concepción Silva Belinzon (1903–1987), Uruguayan writer
Concepción Úsuga (born 2001), Colombian weightlifter
Danilo Concepcion (born 1958), Filipino lawyer and academic administrator
Dave Concepción (born 1948), former Major League baseball player during the 1970s and 1980s
Emerito Concepción (born 1962), Filipino sport shooter
Félix Alberto Beltrán Concepción (born 1938), Cuban artist
Francisca Josefa de la Concepción (1671–1742), Colombian nun and mystic
Gaby Concepcion, Filipina actress and lawyer
Gabby Concepcion (born 1964), Filipino actor
Gabriela Concepción (born 1989), Venezuelan beauty pageant contestant
Gerardo Concepción (born 1992), Cuban baseball player
Gerónimo de la Concepción (1642–1698), Spanish Carmelite and writer
Iluminada Concepción (born 1956), Cuban tennis player
Imelda Concepcion (born 1936), Filipina actress
Hermogenes Concepcion Jr. (1920–2018), Associate Justice of the Supreme Court of the Philippines
Janier Concepción (born 1985), Cuban rower
Juan Gabriel Concepción (born 1972), Spanish pole vaulter
Julio Concepcion, American politician
KC Concepcion (born 1985), Filipina entertainer
Lee Concepcion (born 1967), Filipino swimmer
Luis Concepción (born 1985), Panamanian boxer
Mercedes Concepcion (born 1928), Filipina social scientist
Monchile Concepción (1905–1967), Puerto Rican baseball player
Nicholas de Concepcion, pirate
Onix Concepción (born 1957), Puerto Rican baseball player
Pedro Concepcion, Filipino lawyer and election official
Rafael Concepción (born 1982), Panamanian boxer
René Concepcion (born 1969), Filipino swimmer
Roberto Concepcion (1903–1987), Chief Justice of the Supreme Court of the Philippines
Rudy Concepción (1912–1940), Filipino film actor
Sabino Bautista Concepción (born 1963), Mexican politician
Sam Concepcion (born 1992), Filipino entertainer
Tomas Fernandez Concepcion (1933–2012), Filipino politician and sculptor
Valerie Concepcion (born 1987), Filipina entertainer
Venancio Concepción, Filipino general
Vincent and Liza Concepcion, respondents in the United States Supreme Court case AT&T Mobility v. Concepcion
Yam Concepcion (born 1988), Filipina actress
Conchita,  a popular diminutive form of this name

Ships
Concepción (carrack), a 16th-century Spanish ship that participated in Magellan's circumnavigation
CSS Robert E. Lee, an American Civil War-era ship, later the Chilean Navy ship Concepción
El Concepcion, a ship that sunk near the Dominican Republic in 1641

Historical events
Battle of Concepción, in the Texas War of Independence
Battle of La Concepción, between Chile and Peru
Battle of Concepción, Chile (disambiguation)

See also
 Basilica of the Immaculate Conception (disambiguation)
 Bishop of Concepción (disambiguation)
 Cathedral of the Immaculate Conception (disambiguation)
 Cathedral of Saint Mary of the Immaculate Conception (disambiguation)
 Church of the Immaculate Conception (disambiguation)
 Concepción Department (disambiguation)
 Concepción District (disambiguation)
 Concepción Province (disambiguation)
 Conception (disambiguation)
 Inmaculada Concepción (disambiguation)
 La Concepción (disambiguation)
 La Purísima Concepción (disambiguation)

Spanish feminine given names